A counterplan is a  plan set up in opposition to another plan.

Counterplan may also refer to:

 Counterplan, a component of debate theory, commonly used in policy debates
 Counterplan (Soviet planning), a plan put forth by workers to exceed the expectations of the state plan
 Counterplan (film), a 1931 Soviet film